The Dacht-i-Navar Group is a volcanic field in Afghanistan. It consists of a group of lava domes and stratovolcanoes at the southern end of the Dacht-i-Navar depression and partly extend north of the same depression. They were active during the Pliocene and Pleistocene.

Geography and geology 

Dacht-i-Navar lies southwest of Kabul, about one third the way to Kandahar.

Geological context 

In 1969, the history of volcanism in Afghanistan was poorly known. Only a few volcanic fields of Pliocene-Quaternary age exist in Afghanistan. Aside from orogen-associated volcanism, volcanism typical of rifting zones is also found. Magma production through the Pliocene-Pleistocene has been low and volcanoes cover only small areas.

The complex itself 

Dacht-i-Navar is formed by over ten central volcanoes that form lava sheets and tuffs stacked on top of each other. They also display traces of glacial activity which bury most of the edifices. 

The Doni Yarchi massif lies in the north. Other volcanic centres are Mount Burguk, Mount Hut and Mount Mohammad, in total over 24 individual centres were found. 

The highest of these centres exceed  of altitude. Some of these volcanoes still display craters. Extrusive bodies such as lava domes are also found, as well as two calderas associated with stratovolcanoes.

The few more northern centres are separated from the main complex by the clay-filled Nawar basin and a surrounding Pleistocene terrace. Despite evaporation, a lake persists within the basin. Probably, the depression was once a valley cut into schists which are pre-Devonian and still crop out in some places. This valley drained southwestward towards the Arghandab River that was eventually blocked by volcanic activity. The Ab-i-Khanduli dry valley still connects Dacht-i-Navar to the Arghandab river. Another possibility is that the valley originally drained eastward towards Qarabagh. 

Metamorphic rocks of Paleozoic age form the basement. Additional volcanic centres are found both west and east of Dacht-i-Navar. The volcanism appears to be associated with left-lateral strike-slip faulting in the area.

Petrology 

The field has erupted andesite and dacite. The dacites are found in the lower parts and the andesites in the upper part of the volcanic deposits; some rhyodacites and rhyolites are found among the oldest rocks. The rocks have a porphyric nature and phenocrysts include amphibole, biotite, clinopyroxene, magnetite, olivine, orthopyroxene, plagioclase and quartz, with different rock types having different composition. Chemically, the rocks belong to the calc-alkaline series.

Dacht-i-Navar is a source of obsidian, one of the few in Southwest Asia. Some Paleolithic archeological sites in the area have used this obsidian. This obsidian does not appear to have been transported to large distances from Dacht-i-Nawar.

Eruptive history 

Potassium-argon dating has yielded ages of 2.7–2.8 million years ago for the dacites. Quaternary pebbles lie on top of the andesites. The Zarkadak volcano was active 1.68–1.59 million years ago. Volcanic activity involved the eruption of ignimbrites followed by the extrusion of lava domes. Volcanic activity at Dacht-i-Navar was accompanied by the activity of hot springs that deposited travertine.

Dacht-i-Navar is considered to be the source of volcanic ash layers found in the Sivalik Hills that were erupted 2.31 ± 0.84 to 2.8 ± 0.56 million years ago.

The age of the last eruption is unknown. No  emissions from this volcanic group have been detected over Pakistan, but hot springs are still active in the Dacht-i-Navar basin.

See also 
 List of volcanoes in Afghanistan
 Lists of volcanoes

References

Sources

External links 
 Satellite images
 Global Volcanism Program
 

Volcanoes of Afghanistan
Mountains of Afghanistan
Pleistocene lava domes
Volcanic groups